Alain-François Le Borgne, seigneur de Kerusoret or Keruzoret (c. 1706, Brittany - 12 May 1771, Brest) was a French naval officer from a Breton noble family. His final rank was chef d'escadre.

Sources
Bulletin de la Société Académique de Brest, 1890, p. 237

French Navy admirals
1771 deaths
18th-century Breton people
Year of birth uncertain